Panagiotis "Totis" Filakouris (born 1 March 1947) is a Greek former footballer who played as a forward.

Fylakouris played for Panathinaikos for ten years from 1965 until 1975 and was a member of the team that played in the final of the European Cup of Champions in 1971 at Wembley Stadium. Late in his career he also had a stint with Ethnikos Piraeus.

After his playing days were over, Fylakouris coached Greek-American clubs in the US and was also coach for Panachaiki and interim coach for Panathinaikos in 2005. He is still very popular to the fans of the green club.

Personal life
Totis Fylakouris' elder brother Dimitris Fylakouris also played for Panathinaikos in the early 1960s.

References

External links
Profile at pao.gr

1947 births
Living people
Greek footballers
Footballers from Athens
Association football forwards
Super League Greece players
Panathinaikos F.C. players
Ethnikos Piraeus F.C. players
Egaleo F.C. players
Greek football managers
Panathinaikos F.C. managers